Abavisan (also Romanized as Abavisān, Abaveysān, Abavīsān, and Abveysān; also known as Aboo Besan, Abū Nesyān, and Istin) is a village in Miyan Jovin Rural District, Helali District, Joghatai County, Razavi Khorasan Province, Iran. At the 2006 census, its population was 739, in 185 families.

See also 

 List of cities, towns and villages in Razavi Khorasan Province

References 

Populated places in Joghatai County